The 1980 Kansas Jayhawks football team represented the University of Kansas in the Big Eight Conference during the 1980 NCAA Division I-A football season. In their sixth season under head coach Don Fambrough, the Jayhawks compiled a 4–5–2 record (3–3–1 against conference opponents), and were outscored by opponents by a combined total of 208 to 171. They played their home games at Memorial Stadium in Lawrence, Kansas.

The team's statistical leaders included Frank Seurer with 797 passing yards, Kerwin Bell with 1,114 rushing yards, and David Verser with 576 receiving yards. Harry Sydney and Frank Wattlelet were the team captains.

In October 1982, an NCAA investigation revealed that running back Kerwin Bell was not an eligible player for the 1980 and 1981 seasons due to not surpassing the 2.0 minimum high school GPA. The Big Eight Conference ruled that all Kansas games in which Bell played were to be forfeited, bringing their conference record to 1–6 on the year. However, Kansas still records these games as victories in their record book, including their 20–18 victory over rival Kansas State. The two schools dispute the overall series record because of this.

Schedule

Roster

References

Kansas
Kansas Jayhawks football seasons
Kansas Jayhawks football